Glenea pascoei is a species of beetle in the family Cerambycidae. It was described by Per Olof Christopher Aurivillius in 1923 and is known from Borneo.

References

pascoei
Beetles described in 1923